Jílek (feminine Jílková) is a Czech surname, it may refer to:
 Antonín Jílek, Czech sport shooter
 August von Jilek, Czech naval doctor
 Bohumil Jílek, Czech communist politician
 Dan Jilek, American football player
 František Jílek, Czech conductor
 Jan Jílek, Czech football referee
 Jaroslav Jílek, Czech javelin thrower
 Jaroslav Jílek (table tennis), Czech table tennis player
 Markéta Jílková, Czech writer
 Martin Jílek, Czech footballer
 Václav Jílek, Czech football manager

Czech-language surnames